Ruili is a county-level city of Dehong Prefecture, in the west of Yunnan province, People's Republic of China. It is a major border crossing between China and Myanmar, with the town of Muse located across the border.

Name 

The city is named after the Shweli River. 瑞 ruì means "auspicious", and 丽 lì means "beautiful". An older name of Ruili is Měngmǎo, from Dai language "foggy place".

Geography and climate

Ruili is on the border with Myanmar. 64% of the population of Ruili are members of five highland and lowland ethnic minorities including Dai, Jingpo, Deang, Lisu, Achang. It is an important location for trade with Myanmar, in both legal and illegal goods and services. Prostitution and drug trade in the city are not uncommon.

Ruili has a warm humid subtropical climate (Köppen Cwa), and is generally humid. Summer is long and there is virtually no "winter" as such; instead, there is a dry season (December through April) and wet season (May through October). A drier heat prevails from February till early May before the onset of the monsoon from the Indian Ocean. Rainfall totals about  annually, with nearly 70% of it occurring from June to September.

Bordered by monsoon evergreen broad-leaved forest, Ruili Botanical Garden is just north of the City and covers 5,000 acres of well-preserved native vegetation.

Administrative divisions
Ruili City has 3 towns and 3 townships. 
3 towns
 Mengmao
 Wanding
 Nongdao
3 townships
 Jiexiang
 Huyu
 Mengxiu

Demography 

Han Chinese and Dai mostly live in the valley, in the city; Jingpo and Deang live mostly in the outskirts in the surrounding hills.

Industrial parks 

 Wanding Border Economic Cooperation Zone
Wanding Border Economic Cooperation Zone (WTBECZ) is a Chinese State Council-approved Industrial Park based in Wanding Town of Ruili City founded in 1992 and was established to promote Sino–Burmese trade. The zone spans  and is focused on developing trading, processing, agriculture resources and tourism.
 Ruili Border Economic Cooperation Zone
Ruili Border Economic Cooperation Zone (RLBECZ) is a Chinese State Council-approved Industrial Park based in Ruili founded in 1992 and was established to promote trade between China and Myanmar. The area's import and export trade include the processing industry, local agriculture and biological resources are very promising. Sino-Myanmar business is growing fast. Myanmar is now one of Yunnan's biggest foreign trade partners. In 1999, Sino-Myanmar trade accounted for 77.4% of Yunnan's foreign trade. In the same year, exports for electromechanical equipments came up to US$55.28 million. Main exports here include fiber cloth, cotton yarn, ceresin wax, mechanical equipments, fruits, rice seeds, fiber yarn and tobacco.

Transportation
The Dali–Ruili Railway, which will connect Ruili with China's national railway network, is under construction.

References

External links 

 Ruili City Official Website 
 Ruili Municipal People's Government 
 Article about Ruili's economy

 
County-level divisions of Dehong Prefecture
China–Myanmar border crossings
Cities in Yunnan